Horace Weldon Gilmore (April 4, 1918 – January 25, 2010) was a United States district judge of the United States District Court for the Eastern District of Michigan.

Education and career

Born in Columbus, Ohio, Gilmore received a Bachelor of Arts degree from the University of Michigan in 1939 and a Juris Doctor from the University of Michigan Law School in 1942. He was a lieutenant in the United States Naval Reserve during World War II, from 1942 to 1946. He was a law clerk to Judge Charles Casper Simons of the United States Court of Appeals for the Sixth Circuit from 1946 to 1947, and was then in private practice in Detroit, Michigan from 1947 to 1951. He was a special Assistant United States Attorney for the Eastern District of Michigan from 1951 to 1952, returning to private practice from 1953 to 1954. He was a member of the Michigan Board of Tax Appeals in 1954, and a deputy state attorney general of Michigan from 1954 to 1956. He was a judge on the 3rd Judicial Circuit in Detroit from 1956 to 1980.

Federal judicial service

On May 22, 1980, Gilmore was nominated by President Jimmy Carter to a seat on the United States District Court for the Eastern District of Michigan vacated by Judge Cornelia Groefsema Kennedy. He was confirmed by the United States Senate on June 18, 1980, and received his commission the same day. He assumed senior status on May 1, 1991, serving in that status until his death on January 25, 2010, in Grosse Point, Michigan.

References

Sources
 

1918 births
2010 deaths
Michigan state court judges
Judges of the United States District Court for the Eastern District of Michigan
United States district court judges appointed by Jimmy Carter
20th-century American judges
University of Michigan Law School alumni
United States Navy officers
Assistant United States Attorneys
United States Navy personnel of World War II
United States Navy reservists